Ian McLean (27 August 192923 March 1965) was an Australian rules football player in the Victorian Football League, (VFL).

Family
The son of Alexander Leonard McLean (1887–1956),  and Elsie May McLean (1888–1961), née Robertson, Ian McLean was born at Bendigo, Victoria on 27 August 1929.

He married Rita Joan Driver in 1955.

Football
Ian McLean played in Melbourne premiership teams in 1955, 1957 and 1959, and well as the runner-up side of 1954.  Courageous, quick both over the ground and in terms of reflexes, and a smooth ball handler, McLean, who hailed from Bendigo, played a total of 146 VFL games and booted 29 goals for the Demons between 1951 and 1960.

Death
He died at his residence in Chadstone, Victoria on 23 March 1965.

Notes

References
 Melbourne Glimpses, The Age, (Wednesday, 9 June 1954), p.12.

External links

 
 
 Ian McLean at Demonwiki.
 Ian McLean at Boyles Football Photos.

1929 births
1965 deaths
Melbourne Football Club players
South Bendigo Football Club players
Australian rules footballers from Bendigo
Melbourne Football Club Premiership players
Three-time VFL/AFL Premiership players